Eslick is a surname. Notable people with the surname include:

 Danny Eslick (born 1986), American motorcycle racer
 Edward Everett Eslick (1872–1932), American politician
 Tollemache Heriot Eslick (1877–1948), English amusement engineer
 Willa McCord Blake Eslick (1878–1961), American politician, wife of Edward